Jessica Raskin (born April 26, 1982) is an American actress. She is perhaps best known for her role as Susie Q in the John Waters film Cry-Baby.

Select filmography

External links

1982 births
Living people
American film actresses
Actresses from Virginia
People from Woodbridge, Virginia
21st-century American women